Terry Andreas Canales is an American politician.

Canales is from Jim Wells County, Texas. He served in the Texas House of Representatives from 1973 to 1975 and was a Democrat.

References

Living people
Hispanic and Latino American state legislators in Texas
Democratic Party members of the Texas House of Representatives
Year of birth missing (living people)
People from Jim Wells County, Texas
20th-century American politicians